Larchfield House is a residence in the townland of Carrignamuck, situated  north of Coachford village. The National Inventory of Architectural Heritage (NIAH) suggests that it was built , and describes it as a "detached three-bay two-storey house, with gabled bays and a full height canted bay window". The NIAH entry describes its architectural style as being "fashionable [..] in the latter part of the nineteenth century".

The house is located within Carrignamuck townland in an area known as Larchfield, as indicated on both the 1842 and 1901 surveyed OS maps. The property was previously the residence and surgery of a local General Practitioner, and this is reflected in the crossroads adjoining the entrance being known as the 'doctor's crossroads'.

Today, it is a private residence, and is not accessible to the public.

See also
Carrignamuck (townland)
Carrignamuck Tower House
Colthurst's Bridge
Dripsey Castle Bridge
Dripsey Castle, Carrignamuck
Trafalgar Monument, Carrignamuck

References

External links
 1842 surveyed OS map (maps.osi.ie)
 1901 surveyed OS map (maps.osi.ie)
 acrheritage.info

Buildings and structures in County Cork